Robert Guinan (March 14, 1934 – April 3, 2016) was an American painter based in Chicago. The subject matter of his work includes but has not been limited to street performers, musicians, barflies, historical scenes, landscapes and building structures. Lauded in Europe but widely unknown in his native Chicago, Guinan's work reflects a documentary quality that has been compared to "that of the Parisian demi-mondes as chronicled and interpreted by Toulouse-Lautrec."

Collections

Public collections include Fonds National d’Art Contemporain, Paris; Musée des Beaux-Arts, Lyon; Musée de Grenoble; Musée du dessin et de l’estampe originale, Gravelines; Metropolitan Museum of Art, New York; Sintra Museu de Arte Moderna, Collection Berardo, Sintra, Portugal.

Exhibitions
Guinan's work has been featured in exhibitions as follows:

Group Exhibitions

Films

Robert Guinan's life and work has been the subject of two films, including the 1995 documentary Division Street U.S.A.: Following Robert Guinan (Frédéric Compain, 52 min, Coproduction Dune, Leapfrog Production, Arte - G.E.I.E.) and the 2006 documentary Robert Guinan, un peintre en marge du rêve américain (Albert Loeb and Nicole Sérès, 48 min, Les Films Lazare)

Life and career

Guinan was born in 1934 in Watertown, New York. Boyhood fascination with the work of magazine illustrator Herbert Morton Stoops led to an interest in drawing and painting. Because formal art instruction was not offered at Immaculate Heart Academy (IHA), Guinan's mother Dorothy arranged night classes for her son with Mary Morley, an art teacher at Watertown High School.

Guinan's first exhibition occurred when he was just 15 at the Watertown library. A critic in the Watertown Daily Times called the show "a most creditable exhibit for an artist of his age and training". It led to annual exhibits of his works through his high school years. Times writer David F. Lane wrote in 1950 that his paintings were "of such character in composition, coloration and brush technique as to definitely forecast a promising future for him in the field of art." He praised the 16-year-old artist's "rare genius for capturing action in tense moments, and in rendering facial expressions which accurately represent the mood and thought of the character."

Guinan graduated from IHA in 1951. Living in a YMCA hotel, his first job was as an assistant in a dental lab, constructing false teeth. He enlisted in the Air Force in 1953, after considering a potential Army draft during the Korean War. He served as a radio operator in North Africa and Turkey while continuing to practice drawing and painting. Emulating the post-impressionists who were his heroes, he took an interest in the peasant life and brothels he encountered in Ankara, embarking upon a life's work of portraying the disenfranchised in his paintings and drawings. It was also during his time in the Air Force that Guinan developed an interest in African-American Blues and Jazz.

In 1959, Guinan moved to Chicago, Illinois, enrolling in the School of the Art Institute. He was immediately enthralled by the nightclub culture of the city, discovering that many of the Black recording artists he loved were living and performing in local nightclubs such as the King's Palace and the Queen's Paradise. He also discovered Maxwell Street, an open-air market which had been a Chicago tradition since the beginning of the century; once dominated by Jewish merchants, it was now popular with African American peddlers and Blues musicians.

In 1972, Robert Guinan was introduced to Parisian art dealer Albert Loeb. Beginning in 1973, Guinan worked regularly with the Albert Loeb Gallery. As of 2010 he is represented locally in Chicago.

Guinan died in Evanston in 2016. One son, Paul, is a comic-book artist and creator of the fictional character Boilerplate. Another son, Sean Guinan (b. 1970), is a film maker and musician known for prize-winning films including "Teplitz; the Tyranny of Paradox" and "Flipping the Whale", and his cabaret-style band, Candy Town.

References

External links
 Robert Guinan, on son Paul Guinan's website
  Son Sean Guinan's website

1934 births
2016 deaths
20th-century American painters
American male painters
21st-century American painters
21st-century American male artists
Artists from Chicago
People from Watertown, New York
Deaths from lymphoma
20th-century American male artists